Sansanee Wattananukul (born 14 November 1945, in Buriram Province), née Samanworawong is a Thai actress and voice actress, best known for her roles in the anime series Doraemon as Nobi Nobita. She began career as voice actress since in 1982. Currently she works for Channel 9. She has also played the leading roles in the popular drama Ban Sai Thong aired in the late 1970s on Channel 9, and also in the film Best of Times in 2009.

Filmography

Voice over roles

Anime
 Doraemon as Nobita Nobi
 Dr. Slump (Channel 9 dub) as Arale Norimaki
 Fist of the North Star as Bat, Yuria, Mamiya
 Cobra (Channel 9 dub) as Lady Armaroid
 Kingyo Chūihō! (Channel 9 dub) as Chitose Fujinomiya
 Lady!! as Sarah Frances Russell
 Hunter × Hunter (Channel 9 dub) as Kurapika
 Dragon Quest: Dai no Daibōken (Channel 9 dub) as Leona
 Idol Tenshi Youkoso Youko (Channel 9 dub) as Youko
 Dream Soldier Wingman (Channel 9 dub) - Aoi Yume
 Sailor Moon (Channel 9 dub, rerun on air 2012.) as Sailor Mercury
 Pokémon (Channel 9 dub) as Kasumi, Masato, Hikari
 Saint Seiya: The Lost Canvas (Channel 9 dub) as Crane Yuzuriha
 Ojamajo Doremi as Doremi Harukaze
 Nintama Rantarō as Rantarō Inadera
 Beyblade as Takao Kinomiya
 Pretty Cure as Honoka Yukishiro
 Pretty Cure Splash Star as Mai Mishou
 Corrector Yui as Yui Kasuga
 Mirmo! (Channel 9 dub) as Kaede Minami
 Pygmalio as Orie/Angel, Leon
 Glass Mask (Channel 9 dub) as Maya Kitajima
 Inazuma Eleven (Channel 9 dub) as Ichirōta Kazemaru, Touko Zaizen, Fuyuka "Fuyuppe" Kudō
 Rockman.EXE as Mayl Sakurai
 Hanada Shōnen Shi as Ichiro Hanada
 Digimon Savers (Channel 9 dub) as Yoshi Fujieda
 Bakugan Battle Brawlers as Marucho Marukuro, Alice Gehabich
 Idaten Jump as Sho Yamato
 Powerpuff Girls Z (Channel 9 dub) as Miyako Goutokuji/Rolling Bubbles
 Battle Spirits: Shounen Toppa Bashin as Suiren/My Sunshine
 Beyblade: Metal Fusion as Kenta Yumiya
 Shaman King as Manta Oyamada, Lyserg Diethel
 Love Hina as Naru Narusegawa
 Fruits Basket as Tohru Honda
 Tenjho Tenge as Aya Natsume
 Zatch Bell! as Mizuno Suzume
 Yakitate!! Japan as Tsukino Azusagawa
 Tokyo Mew Mew as  Momomiya Ichigo
 Grander Musashi as Musashi Kazama
 Cardcaptor Sakura as Kinomoto Sakura
 The Mythical Detective Loki Ragnarok as Daidōji Mayura
 Anpanman as Batako San
 Full Metal Panic! as Teletha Tessa Testarossa
 D.N. Angel as Harada Risa
 Saikano as Chise
 Chūka Ichiban! as Zhi Lao/Shirou
 Kiddy Grade as Lumière
 Oh My Goddess! as Belldandy
 Negima! Magister Negi Magi as Negi Springfield
 Hellsing as Seras Victoria
 School Rumble as Tsukamoto Tenma
 Sailor Moon Sailor Stars as Tsukino Usagi
 Digimon Adventure as Takenouchi Sora, Takeru Takaishi
 Digimon Adventure 02 as Takenouchi Sora, Takeru Takaishi, Hikari Yagami

Tokusatsu dubbing
 Chōjin Sentai Jetman as Kaori Rokumeikan 
 Kyōryū Sentai Zyuranger as Mei/Reiko Chiba
 Ryuuten no ouhi – Saigo no koutei as Hiro (Takako Tokiwa)
 ChalkZone as Penny Sanchez

Television

Television series
 2022 10 Years Ticket (หนังรักเรื่องที่แล้ว) (The One Enterprise-GMMTV/GMM 25) as Pum (ยายปุ้ม) With Yong Chernyim

Film

References

External links
 

Sansanee Wattananukul
Sansanee Wattananukul
1945 births
Living people
Sansanee Wattananukul